Sullivan Lake  is a lake in geographic Ben Nevis Township, Cochrane District, with a small tip in geographic Katrine Township, Timiskaming District, in Northeastern Ontario, Canada. It is in the Saint Lawrence River drainage basin and is the source of the Misema River. The lake is also located in the Pushkin Hills, part of the Blake River Megacaldera Complex.

See also
List of lakes in Ontario

References

Other map sources:

Lakes of Cochrane District
Lakes of Timiskaming District